The Centre de Formation Médicale du Nouveau-Brunswick (CFMNB) is a joint campus of Université de Sherbrooke in Moncton, New Brunswick.

History
Since the 1980s, the Government of New Brunswick has been committed to promoting a francophone medical education within the province. The CFMNB is of historical significance for the maritimes, for it represents the first opportunity for a francophone medical education outside the Province of Québec. The University of Ottawa is a bilingual faculty, offering courses in both French and English.

The first batch of students was accepted in 2006. They later graduated in 2010.

Affiliations

The CFMNB is effectively administered by Université de Sherbrooke. However, since it is located on the site of Université de Moncton, the CFMNB and Université de Moncton share important local demographic interests. Access is granted for the students at the CFMNB to most services from Université de Moncton, and students are registered as members of both universities.

Practical medical training is offered at the Dr. Georges-L.-Dumont University Hospital Centre located nearby and in the clinics and private offices of the physicians associated with the Zone Beauséjour of the Réseau de Santé Vitalité Health Network.

Program

The medical education program offered by the CFMNB is recognized worldwide. While the MD program is of a four-year duration, an MD-MSc is also offered in five years.

Research

The CFMNB has also been involved in medical research since 2008. The research sector of the Centre de formation médicale du Nouveau-Brunswick (CFMNB) contributes to the development of health research in the province through the funding of initiatives, the dissemination of its successes, the collaboration between various actors and organizations, and the training of students who will contribute to the research culture in New Brunswick.

References

External links
www.umoncton.ca/medecine/ – On the Université de Moncton website
www.usherbrooke.ca/medecine/ – On the Université de Sherbrooke website

Université de Sherbrooke
Université de Moncton
Medical schools in Canada
French-language universities and colleges in New Brunswick
Buildings and structures in Moncton
Educational institutions established in 2006
2006 establishments in New Brunswick